Sambao is a studio album by American jazz pianist Kenny Barron, which was released in 1992 on Verve Records label. The album contains eight original instrumental compositions written by Barron.

Track listing

Personnel
Band
Kenny Barron – composer, piano
Nico Assumpção – bass
Mino Cinelu – composer, percussion
Toninho Horta – guitar
Victor Lewis – drums

Production
Joanne Klein – producer
Jean-Philippe Allard – executive producer
Joe Lopes – mixing
Jay Newland – engineer, mixing
José Ortega – mixing

References

External links

Kenny Barron albums
1992 albums
Verve Records live albums